IUB stands for the name of several different universities:
The Islamia University of Bahawalpur, Punjab, Pakistan
Islamic University of Bangladesh, Kushtia, Bangladesh
Independent University, Bangladesh, Dhaka, Bangladesh

Indiana University Bloomington, Indiana, USA
International University Bremen, the former name of Jacobs University Bremen in Bremen, Germany
Also:
The former acronym of the International Union of Biochemistry and Molecular Biology (now IUBMB)